Ng Eng Hen (born 10 December 1958) is a Singaporean politician and former oncologist who has been serving as Minister for Defence since 2011. A member of the governing People's Action Party (PAP), he has been the Member of Parliament (MP) representing the Toa Payoh Central division of Bishan–Toa Payoh GRC since 2001. 

Prior to entering politics, Ng was a consultant surgeon at the Singapore General Hospital (SGH) and later a private surgical oncologist at Mount Elizabeth Hospital. 

He made his political debut in the 2001 general election as part of a five-member PAP team contesting in Bishan–Toa Payoh GRC and won by an uncontested walkover. Ng was later elected as a Member of Parliament (MP) and has been winning subsequent general elections since.

Early life and education
A Chinese Singaporean of Henghua descent, Ng and his five siblings lived in a rental flat in Zion Road during his childhood. He was educated at Anglo-Chinese School and National Junior College before completing medical school at the National University of Singapore. He also underwent fellowship training in surgical oncology at the University of Texas MD Anderson Cancer Center.

Career
Ng was a consultant surgeon at the Singapore General Hospital between 1992 and 1997 before he went into private practice at Mount Elizabeth Hospital as a surgical oncologist between 1997 and 2001.

Political career 

Ng made his political debut in the 2001 general election as part of a five-member PAP team contesting in Bishan–Toa Payoh GRC and won by an uncontested walkover and Ng was elected as the Member of Parliament (MP) representing the Toa Payoh Central ward of Bishan–Toa Payoh GRC. Since 2001, he has been the Member of Parliament for that ward, having successfully retained his seat in subsequent general elections. He is also an adviser to the Bishan–Toa Payoh Town Council and Bishan–Toa Payoh grassroots organisations.

In 2002, Ng was appointed Minister of State for Education and Minister of State for Manpower.

In August 2004, Ng was promoted to full Minister and appointed Minister for Manpower and Second Minister for Education. In 2005, he relinquished his portfolio as Second Minister for Education and became Second Minister for Defence. In April 2008, he stepped down from his post as Minister for Manpower and took up the portfolio of Minister for Education.

Ng was also Chairman of the Jobs Task Force at the Ministry of Manpower, and Chairman of the Inter-Ministerial Committee on Low Wage Workers.

In June 2007, Ng was invited by the French Ministry of Defence to visit the Paris Air Show and also to visit a permanent Republic of Singapore Air Force (RSAF) detachment stationed at Cazaux Air Base.

In March 2010, Ng mentioned that the weight of mother-tongue language examinations in the Primary School Leaving Examination (PSLE) might be reduced in order to benefit some students who are weak in their mother-tongue due to the emphasis on the English language in the Singapore education system. This sparked a debate among Singaporeans who support emphasis on mother-tongue languages in education. Ng subsequently assured Singaporeans that the weight of mother-tongue language in the PSLE would not be reduced.

During the 2011 general election, Ng was part of a five-member PAP team contesting in Bishan–Toa Payoh GRC and won 56.93% of the vote against the Singapore People's Party.

In 2011, Ng stepped down from his role as Minister for Education and was appointed Minister for Defence. In Parliament, he served as Deputy Leader of the House between 2007 and 2011 and later as Leader of the House between 2011 and 2015.

During 2015 general election, Ng lead the five-member PAP team contesting in Bishan–Toa Payoh GRC and won 73.59% of the vote against a second challenge by the Singapore People's Party.

In 2018, the French government awarded Ng the Legion of Honour.

During the 2020 general election, Ng was part of a four-member PAP team contesting in Bishan–Toa Payoh GRC and won about 67% of the vote against the Singapore People's Party.

Personal life
Ng is married to Ivy Ng Swee Lian, a paediatrician and geneticist who has been serving as the chief executive officer of SingHealth and the couple have four children.

References

External links

 Ng Eng Hen on Prime Minister's Office
 Ng Eng Hen on Parliament of Singapore

1958 births
Anglo-Chinese School alumni
Ministers for Education of Singapore
Living people
Members of the Cabinet of Singapore
Members of the Parliament of Singapore
National University of Singapore alumni
People's Action Party politicians
Singaporean politicians of Chinese descent
Recipients of the Olympic Order
Singaporean people of Henghua descent
University of Texas MD Anderson Cancer Center alumni
Ministers for Defence of Singapore
Ministers for Manpower of Singapore